The Innocence Mission is the eponymous debut studio album by the band of the same name. It was recorded in six months in several studios in Los Angeles, California, including the Kiva, Ocean Way Recording, and the Sound Castle. The album cover features the 1894 painting Impromptu Ball by Eva Roos. The album was re-released digitally on May 19, 2009 by A&M Records.

Track listing

 Note: All songs written by Karen Peris, unless otherwise indicated.

References

1989 debut albums
The Innocence Mission albums
Albums produced by Larry Klein
A&M Records albums